Seren may refer to:
 Seren (name)
 Seren Books, a Welsh publishing house
 Seren Network, a Welsh educational organisation to assist high-achieving sixth form students
 Seren, a lord of the Biblical Philistines 
 Seren, an Israel Defense Forces rank
 Seren, a student newspaper published by Bangor University Students' Union

See also
 Seren taun, an annual traditional Sundanese rice harvest festival and ceremony